The 2006 3M Performance 400 Presented by Post-it Picture Paper was a NASCAR Nextel Cup Series stock car race held on June 18, 2006 at Michigan International Speedway in Brooklyn, Michigan. Contested over 129 laps  – shortened from 200 laps due to rain on a 2-mile (3.218 km) speedway, it was the 15th race of the 2006 NASCAR Nextel Cup Series season. Kasey Kahne of Evernham Motorsports won the race.

Background
The track is used primarily for NASCAR events. It is sometimes known as a "sister track" to Texas World Speedway, and was used as the basis of Auto Club Speedway. The track is owned by International Speedway Corporation (ISC). Michigan International Speedway is recognized as one of motorsports' premier facilities because of its wide racing surface and high banking (by open-wheel standards; the 18-degree banking is modest by stock car standards).

Entry list

Qualifying

Results

Race Statistics
 Time of race: 2:10:19
 Average Speed: 
 Pole Speed: 
 Cautions: 9 for 37 laps
 Margin of Victory: under caution
 Lead changes: 17
 Percent of race run under caution: 28.7%         
 Average green flag run: 10.2 laps

References

External links 
Full race coverage

3M Performance 400
3M Performance 400
NASCAR races at Michigan International Speedway
June 2006 sports events in the United States